Yoram Barzel (1931-2022) was an Israeli economist and a professor in the Department of Economics at the University of Washington. He was interested in property rights, applied price theory, and political economy.

Education 
Barzel graduated with a B.A. (1953) and M.A. (1956) in economics from Hebrew University of Jerusalem. He completed his Ph.D. in economics from the University of Chicago in 1961. He specializes in price theory and economic organization.

Research 
Barzel is known for developing a property rights/transaction cost approach to economics and he has written on topics ranging from car racing to slavery, to Jewish lending to voting rules in condominium associations. Among his many ideas are those about racing to claim assets, multitasking, rationing by waiting, divided ownership of complex assets, measurement costs, and the economic origins of democracy. In the process Barzel's work unearthed the economic rationale for many institutions and offered a framework for analyzing them. Barzel holds an important place among all economists for expanding the scope of economic science in a way that focuses attention on the importance of institutions and the economic logic of their variety. He took a lot from discussions with his fellow mate at Seattle, Steven N. S. Cheung, but both were not sharing the same opinion about the/their master, Ronald H. Coase.

Book 
Following are the books published by Barzel.
 The Political Economy of the Oil Import Quota, (with Christopher D. Hall), (Prefaced by George Stigler), Hoovers Institution Press, Stanford University, 1977
 Economic Analysis of Property Rights, Cambridge University Press, 1989.
 Productivity Change, Public Goods and Transaction Costs: Essays at the Boundaries of Microeconomics, (Economists of the Twentieth Century), Edward Elgar, 1995.
 A Theory of the State: Economic Rights, Legal Rights, and the Scope of the State, Cambridge University Press, 2002.

References 
 Yoram Barzel at the University of Washington.
 

Hebrew University of Jerusalem Faculty of Social Sciences alumni
University of Chicago alumni
University of Washington faculty
1931 births
Living people
Israeli economists
Israeli expatriates in the United States